The Pontifical Catholic University of São Paulo (PUC-SP), locally known as PUC or the Catholic University, is a private and non-profit Catholic university. It is one of the largest and most prestigious universities of Brazil.  It is maintained by the Catholic Archdiocese of São Paulo. The university is also responsible for the St. Lucinda Hospital (Sorocaba) and the TUCA theatre (São Paulo)

Most of the scientific production in PUC-SP is in the areas of law, philosophy, social sciences, economics, education, social service, and communications; in these areas, it is considered one of the most important universities in Latin America, and internationally recognized by the issues and research in disorders of human communication, political economics, semiotics and psychology. It has national and international recognition for its teaching and tradition, appearing in excellent positions in many Brazilians and globals university rankings (with due regard to the criteria and methodologies used). In 2016, for example, according to the Brazilian Ranking de Universidades da Folha (RUF), the institution was considered the best private university of Brazil by the category of teaching quality. Besides that, fifteen courses from PUC-SP are the best in the country among private universities and another eight are among the top five. Nowadays, the university is in a privileged position: the annually published Ministry of Education's official ranking of higher education indicates that  PUC-SP is considered the best private university in the State of São Paulo (the largest, richest and most populous state in the whole country) and the second best private university in Brazil (just after the Pontifical Catholic University of Rio de Janeiro PUC-RJ).

Internationally, it figured in the 2016 QS World University Rankings (Quacquarelli Symonds) as the 38th best university in Latin America, the 52nd best university in the BRICS (Brazil, Russia, India, China and South Africa) and, according to the same ranking, in 2018, it was considered the 21st best university in Latin America. In 2019, QS Ranking also classified PUC-SP as the 49th best university in the BRICS group and sixth in Brazil (behind USP, Unicamp, UFRJ, Unifesp e Unesp). Thus, not only academically, the university stands out with its visibility in the market. PUC-SP is one of the most respected institutions in the job market in all Latin America and in the BRICS countries. A professional formed by PUC is highly valued: the British ranking also classified the university as the fourth best Brazilian university in employability and 19th in Latin America.

PUC-SP was the first university in Brazil to offer graduate programmes in the areas of Philosophy, Multimedia, Social Service, Psychology of Learning, Applied Linguistics and Speech-language Therapy. It also was the second university to offer a bachelor's degree in International Relations, which offers "double diplôme" for selected students that can finish their studies in Sciences Po. Since 2003, PUC-SP participates in the joint graduate program in International Relations Programa San Tiago Dantas together with UNICAMP and UNESP, one of the most important graduate programmes in the area in Brazil. Since 2010 it also offers a joint master's degree with Pantheon-Sorbonne University at "Economie de La Mondialisation" ("Mestrado Profissional em Economia da Mundialização e do Desenvolvimento").

Despite being maintained by the Catholic Archdiocese, PUC-SP is well recognized in the city of São Paulo as a liberal environment since its professors and alumni's historical political engagements during the military dictatorship, especially within its main Perdizes campus, which hosts the Philosophy, Social Sciences, Communications, Arts and Humanities courses.

In 2020, the average annual fee was about US$6700, making it one of the most expensive universities in Brazil. However, there are several full scholarships available for excellent students and undergraduates with financial difficulties; for those who are scholarship recipients, one free meal a day and free transportation is also offered.

Besides postgraduate programms (29 Masters and PhDs), research is also encouraged at the undergraduate level: every year the university provides almost 400 research grants (US$800/ year) for the Institutional Scientific Initiation Program (similar to the Undergraduate Research Opportunities Program in the U.S.), a national integrated system organized by the National Council for Scientific and Technological Development (CNPq) that makes research undergrad students 2,2 times more likely to achieve a master's degree and 1,51 time to became a PhD.

In 2010, 80% of employees had a college degree. In 2020, 63,3% of PUC-SP's researchers were women.

History

Foundation 
The Pontifícia Universidade Católica de São Paulo was founded in 1946, from the union of the Faculdade de Filosofia, Ciências e Letras de São Bento (School of Philosophy, Sciences and Letters of São Bento, founded in 1908) and the Paulista School of Law. Together, four other institutions of the Church were connected.

Founded by the archbishop of São Paulo, Cardinal Carlos Carmelo Vasconcellos Motta as the "Catholic University of São Paulo", the university received the title of "Pontifical Catholic University" in 1947, by the Pope Pius XII.

In 1969s, PUC-SP was the first university in Brazil to have a post-graduation course.

During the Military Dictatorship 
During the Military Dictatorship in Brazil, many students and professors at PUC-SP were present in manifestations against the Government, and the archbishop at that time, Paulo Evaristo Arns, admitted teachers from the public universities who were dismissed by the militaries. Some of the persons who started working at PUC are Florestan Fernandes, Octavio Ianni, Bento Prado Jr., José Arthur Gianotti.

In 1977, PUC hosted the 29th meeting of the Sociedade Brasileira para o Progresso da Ciência (SBPC, Brazilian Society for the Progress of Science), which had been forbidden by the government in public universities. In September, some students celebrated the third National Meeting of the Students, also forbidden by the dictatorship. As a response, troops of the Military Police broke into the campus and arrested some students, professors and other workers.

In the early 1980s, PUC-SP was the first Brazilian university to elect the rector and other administrative functions by direct vote from the students and teachers. In 1984, two fires (one in September, the other in December, the latter believe to be criminal) damaged the theater of the university.

Financial crisis 
In the early 2000s, two new campuses, one in Santana and one in Barueri, were created.

In 2001, the university had a deficit of 4 million reais, and that deficit increased in the following years, forcing PUC-SP to make a loan with banks, which generated a debt of 82 million reais by the end of 2005. and the results could be observed for most of the year 2006. Some courses were closed for the low demand and the several professors were fired (although some of them had accepted to have their salaries decreased to avoid being dismissed), generating protests from professors and students. By the end of 2006, the university had its first non-deficitary months.

In 2012, for the first time since the students, professors and staff have been given the right to directly elect the university's rector, the most voted candidate (Dirceu de Mello, which had already been elected for the 2008–2012 mandate and was on campaign for reelection) was not appointed for the position by Odilo Scherer, bishop-cardinal and responsible for appointing the rector. Instead, he opted for Anna Cintra, the least voted of all three candidates. She accepted the position, even though she signed a document (a gesture imitated by the other two candidates) promising not to take over unless she was the most voted candidate. The cardinal's decision was received with dissatisfaction by students and professors, who started a strike for indefinite time and did other demonstrations as an answer to Anna Cintra's indication. On 30 November, she tried to gain access to the rector's room, but was barred by the students, who surrounded her and her bodyguards and caused her to flee by taxi.

Campuses
The main campus of PUC-SP and its administrative headquarters are located in Perdizes, a middle-class neighbourhood in the subprefecture of Lapa, in the west side of São Paulo City. It mostly consists of academic buildings, the University Theater (TUCA) and the University Church. Most of these buildings, built between 1920 and 1940, are part of the historical patrimonium of the city. The School of Exact Sciences and Technology is located near the city centre (Consolação Campus) while Business and Economy courses are also offered in the north side of São Paulo City (Santana Campus). The School of Medical and Health Sciences is located in the city of Sorocaba (90 km from São Paulo) and a campus in the city of Barueri offers courses of Business, Economics, Physical Therapy and Psychology.

Unities and courses

Admission
Like other Brazilian universities, students are admitted by an entrance exam called vestibular which consists of two tests containing questions on languages, science, math and history. The vestibular of PUC-SP also selects students for other colleges and universities in the state of São Paulo (Examples: Faculty of Medicine of Marília (public institution), Faculty of Medicine of ABC and the Faculty of Law of São Bernardo do Campo).

Notable professors and alumni

Professors
Economy school
 Plínio de Arruda Sampaio (1930–2014), Federal Deputy for São Paulo
 Celso Daniel (1951–2002), Mayor of Santo André
 Celso Furtado (1920–2004), Minister of Development and Minister of Culture
 Guido Mantega (1949–), Finance Minister
 Aloísio Mercadante (1954–), Senator for São Paulo

Education school
 Paulo Freire (1921–1997), critical pedagogy theorist

Law school
 Osvaldo Aranha Bandeira de Melo (1908–1980), Director of São Paulo city legal department, first lay rector of PUC-SP between 1963 and 1972, desembargador of the Court of São Paulo
 Tércio Sampaio Ferraz Júnior (1941–), philosopher of law and jurist.
 Michel Temer (1940-), President of Brazil.

Philosophy school
 Zeljko Loparić (1939–), History of Philosophy scholar
 Bento Prado Júnior (1937–2007), literary critic, writer, poet and translator
 Jeanne Marie Gagnebin (1952 –   ), philosopher, History of Philosophy scholar and writer
Sociology school
 Octavio Ianni (1926–2004), populism and imperialism scholar
 Florestan Fernandes (1920–1995), Federal Deputy for São Paulo
 Maurício Tragtenberg (1929–1998), Libertarian Education exponent

Arts and Letters school
 Haroldo de Campos (1929–2003), literary critic, writer, translator and one of the most important poet of twentieth-century Brazilian poetry.

Alumni
Nicandro Durante, Chief executive of British American Tobacco
Maria Rita Kehl, psychoanalyst and writer
Gabriel Chalita, Secretary of education of the State of São Paulo
 Antonio Claudio Mariz de Oliveira, criminalist lawyer
 José Dirceu, Chief of Staff
 Luiz Fernando Furlan, Finance Minister and entrepreneur
 Reynaldo Gianecchini, actor
 Amir Slama, stylist and entrepreneur
 Marta Suplicy, psychologist, and mayor of São Paulo city
 Monalisa Perrone, journalist of TV Globo
 Shigeaki Ueki, President of Petrobrás
 Rui Ricardo Dias, actor
 Rafael Cortez, journalist, actor and comedian
Suzane von Richthofen - convicted murderer
Ulisses Soares - Apostle of The Church of Jesus Christ of Latter-Day Saints

See also 
Brazil University Rankings
Universities and Higher Education in Brazil

References

External links

 Official site

Educational institutions established in 1946

1946 establishments in Brazil
Universities and colleges in São Paulo
Universities and colleges in São Paulo (state)
Pontifical universities in Brazil